Lachesillidae (or fateful barklice) is a family of Psocodea (formerly Psocoptera) belonging to the suborder Psocomorpha. Members of the family are characterized by a rounded, free areola postica in their wings. Males have diverse sclerotized genitalic structures. The family includes more than 400 species, most of them in the genus Lachesilla.

Genera
These 26 genera belong to the family Lachesillidae:

 Acantholachesilla c g
 Amazolachesilla c g
 Anomolachesilla c g
 Anomopsocus Roesler, 1940 i c g b
 Antilachesilla c g
 Archaelachesis c g
 Ceratolachesillus c g
 Cuzcolachesilla c g
 Cyclolachesillus c g
 Dagualachesilla c g
 Dagualachesilloides c g
 Ectolachesilla c g
 Eolachesilla c g
 Graphocaecilius c g
 Hemicaecilius c g
 Homoeolachesilla c g
 Lachesilla Westwood, 1840 i c g b
 Mesolachesilla c g
 Nadleria c g
 Nanolachesilla Mockford and Sullivan, 1986 i c g
 Notolachesilla c g
 Prolachesilla Mockford and Sullivan, 1986 i c g
 Tricholachesilla c g
 Waoraniella c g
 Zangilachesilla c g
 Zonolachesillus c g

Data sources: i = ITIS, c = Catalogue of Life, g = GBIF, b = Bugguide.net

Sources

Lienhard, C. & Smithers, C. N. 2002. Psocoptera (Insecta): World Catalogue and Bibliography. Instrumenta Biodiversitatis, vol. 5. Muséum d'histoire naturelle, Genève.

 
Psocoptera families